William Buffum may refer to:
 William B. Buffum, official in the United States Department of State
 William Mansfield Buffum, California and Arizona merchant, investor, and politician